Beaufort station or Beaufort Station may refer to:

 Beaufort station (New Jersey), a former railway station in Roseland, New Jersey
 Marine Corps Air Station Beaufort, a United States Marine Corps air base near Beaufort, South Carolina